WPS may refer to:

Computing and telecommunications
 Wi-Fi Protected Setup, a standard that attempts to automate secure wireless network set up and connection
 .wps, a file extension (including a list of programs using the extension)
 WPS Office, an office suite software developed by Kingsoft
 Nationwide Wireless Priority Service, a system in the United States for prioritizing emergency calls from mobile phones
 Web Processing Service, a web service interface specification from the Open Geo spatial Consortium
 WebSphere Process Server, an IBM service-oriented architecture offering
 Wi-Fi positioning system, a system that calculates the position of a device through nearby Wi-Fi access points
 Workplace Shell, a user interface of the IBM OS/2 operating system
 World Programming System, a development environment for the SAS programming language

Education in the United States
 Walker Public Schools, a defunct school system in Columbia County, Arkansas
 Windermere Preparatory School, a private school in Florida
 Winchester Public Schools (Connecticut)
 Winchester Public Schools (Virginia)
 Winthrop Public Schools (Maine)
 Woodbury Public Schools, New Jersey
 Woodland Public Schools, Washington

Organizations

Canada
 Windsor Police Service
 Winnipeg Police Service

United Kingdom
 Workers Party of Scotland, an anti-revisionist political party
 Women's Police Service, a voluntary organisation

United States
 Western Pipe and Steel Company
 Wisconsin Physicians Service Insurance Corporation, a not-for-profit health insurer
 Wisconsin Public Service, a utility company in northern Wisconsin
 Women's Professional Soccer, an association football league

Other uses
 Welding Procedure Specification
 West Philippine Sea